Saltley TMD was a traction maintenance depot located in Saltley, Birmingham, England. The depot was situated on the east side of the line between Birmingham New Street and Water Orton, and was near Saltley station until the station closed in 1968.

The depot code was SY.

History 
The steam loco shed closed to steam 6 March 1967, but a locomotive inspection point was built along with a few offices. From 1948 to 2008, Class 08 shunters, Class 11, 25, 27, 30, 37, 44, 45, 47, 20, 31, 40, 50 and 56 could be seen at the depot.The loco inspection point was open until 2005 and the locomotives moved to other depots, with the last one leaving in 2008.

Present 
The offices are still open and are a signing on point for DB Schenker drivers but the depot is derelict and there are no trains present.

References

Sources

 Railway depots in England